Belarus participated in the Junior Eurovision Song Contest 2014 in Marsa, Malta. The Belarusian entry was selected through a national final, organised by Belarusian broadcaster National State Television and Radio Company of the Republic of Belarus (BTRC). The final was held on 29 August 2014. Nadezhda Misyakova and her song "Sokol" won the national final, scoring 15 points.

Before Junior Eurovision

National final 
On 6 March 2014, BTRC announced that a national final would be held to select Belarus' entry for the Junior Eurovision Song Contest 2014. A submission period for interested artists was opened and lasted until 9 June 2014. After the deadline passed, 48 applications were received by the broadcaster. A professional jury selected ten artists and songs from the applicants to proceed to the televised national final, which were announced on 17 June 2014.

Final 
The final took place on 29 August 2014 at the studio 600 in Minsk, hosted by Teo, Belarus' 2014 Eurovision contestant, and Ilya Volkov, Belarus' 2013 Junior Eurovision contestant.

The equal combination of votes from a professional jury and the votes from the public resulted in a tie between "Sokal" performed by Nadezhda Misyakova,  "Mamina lyubov" performed by Ksenia & Pavel Lashchevsky and "Geta moy lios" performed by Anna Zaitseva. The tie was resolved by the jury with "Sokal" by Nadezhda Misyakova being announced as the winner of the competition and was thus selected as Belarus' entry in Marsa. The members of the jury were Gennadiy Markevich, Tatyana Parhamovich, Irina Dorofeeva, Lyudmila Borodina, Nadezhda Vasilchenko, Olga Vorobyeva, Tatyana Yakusheva, Elena Treschinskaya and Eduard Zartisky.

In addition to the performances from the competitors, the show featured guest performances by Olga Shamrova' ballet, Olga Satsiuk, Egor Volchek and Lidiya Zablotskaya.

At Junior Eurovision 
At the running order draw which took place on 9 November 2014, Belarus were drawn to open the show on 15 November 2014, preceding .

Voting

Detailed voting results
The following members comprised the Belarusian jury:
 Tatsyana Yakusheva
 Elena Atrashkevich
 Yuriy Vashchuk (Teo)
 Gennady Markevich
 Olga Ryzhikova

Notes

References

Junior Eurovision Song Contest
Belarus
2014